

Events

Pre-1600
36 BC – In the Battle of Naulochus, Marcus Vipsanius Agrippa, admiral of Octavian, defeats Sextus Pompey, son of Pompey, thus ending Pompeian resistance to the Second Triumvirate.
 301 – San Marino, one of the smallest nations in the world and the world's oldest republic still in existence, is founded by Saint Marinus.
 590 – Consecration of Pope Gregory I (Gregory the Great).
 673 – King Wamba of the Visigoths puts down a revolt by Hilderic, governor of Nîmes (France) and rival for the throne.
 863 – Major Byzantine victory at the Battle of Lalakaon against an Arab raid.
1189 – Richard I of England (a.k.a. Richard "the Lionheart") is crowned at Westminster.
1260 – The Mamluks defeat the Mongols at the Battle of Ain Jalut in Palestine, marking their first decisive defeat and the point of maximum expansion of the Mongol Empire.
1335 – At the congress of Visegrád Charles I of Hungary mediates a reconciliation between two neighboring monarchs, John of Bohemia and Casimir III of Poland.  
1411 – The Treaty of Selymbria is concluded between the Ottoman Empire and the Republic of Venice.

1601–1900
1650 – Victory over the royalists in the Battle of Dunbar opens the way to Edinburgh for the New Model Army in the Third English Civil War.
1651 – The Battle of Worcester is the last significant action in the Wars of the Three Kingdoms.
1658 – The death of Oliver Cromwell; Richard Cromwell becomes Lord Protector of England.
1666 – The Royal Exchange burns down in the Great Fire of London.
1777 – American Revolutionary War: During the Battle of Cooch's Bridge, the Flag of the United States is flown in battle for the first time.
1783 – American Revolutionary War: The war ends with the signing of the Treaty of Paris by the United States and the Kingdom of Great Britain.
1798 – The week long battle of St. George's Caye begins between Spain and Britain off the coast of Belize.
1812 – Twenty-four settlers are killed in the Pigeon Roost Massacre in Indiana.
1838 – Future abolitionist Frederick Douglass escapes from slavery.
1843 – King Otto of Greece is forced to grant a constitution following an uprising in Athens.
1855 – American Indian Wars: In Nebraska, 700 soldiers under United States General William S. Harney avenge the Grattan massacre by attacking a Sioux village and killing 100 men, women and children.
1861 – American Civil War: Confederate General Leonidas Polk invades neutral Kentucky, prompting the state legislature to ask for Union assistance.
1870 – Franco-Prussian War: The Siege of Metz begins, resulting in a decisive Prussian victory on October 23.
1875 – The first official game of polo is played in Argentina after being introduced by British ranchers.
1878 – Over 640 die when the crowded pleasure boat  collides with the Bywell Castle in the River Thames.
1879 – Siege of the British Residency in Kabul: British envoy Sir Louis Cavagnari and 72 men of the Guides are massacred by Afghan troops while defending the British Residency in Kabul. Their heroism and loyalty became famous and revered throughout the British Empire.
1895 – John Brallier becomes the first openly paid professional American football player, when he was paid US$10 by David Berry, to play for the Latrobe Athletic Association in a 12–0 win over the Jeanette Athletic Association.

1901–present
1914 – William, Prince of Albania leaves the country after just six months due to opposition to his rule.
  1914   – French composer Albéric Magnard is killed defending his estate against invading German soldiers.
  1914   – World War I: Start of the Battle of Grand Couronné, a German assault against French positions on high ground near the city of Nancy.  
1916 – World War I: Leefe Robinson destroys the German airship Schütte-Lanz SL 11 over Cuffley, north of London; the first German airship to be shot down on British soil.
1925 – , the United States' first American-built rigid airship, was destroyed in a squall line over Noble County, Ohio. Fourteen of her 42-man crew perished, including her commander, Zachary Lansdowne.
1933 – Yevgeniy Abalakov is the first man to reach the highest point in the Soviet Union, Communism Peak (now called Ismoil Somoni Peak and situated in Tajikistan) (7495 m).
1935 – Sir Malcolm Campbell reaches a speed of 304.331 miles per hour on the Bonneville Salt Flats in Utah, becoming the first person to drive an automobile over 300 mph.
1939 – World War II: France, the United Kingdom, New Zealand and Australia declare war on Germany after the invasion of Poland, forming the Allied nations. The Viceroy of India also declares war, but without consulting the provincial legislatures.
  1939   – World War II: The United Kingdom and France begin a naval blockade of Germany that lasts until the end of the war. This also marks the beginning of the Battle of the Atlantic.
1941 – The Holocaust: Karl Fritzsch, deputy camp commandant of the Auschwitz concentration camp, experiments with the use of Zyklon B in the gassing of Soviet POWs.
1942 – World War II: In response to news of its coming liquidation, Dov Lopatyn leads an uprising in the Ghetto of Lakhva (present-day Belarus).
1943 – World War II: British and Canadian troops land on the Italian mainland. On the same day, Walter Bedell Smith and Giuseppe Castellano sign the Armistice of Cassibile, although it is not announced for another five days.
1944 – Holocaust: Diarist Anne Frank and her family are placed on the last transport train from the Westerbork transit camp to the Auschwitz concentration camp, arriving three days later.
1945 – A three-day celebration begins in China, following the Victory over Japan Day on September 2.
1950 – "Nino" Farina becomes the first Formula One Drivers' champion after winning the 1950 Italian Grand Prix.
1954 – The People's Liberation Army begins shelling the Republic of China-controlled islands of Quemoy, starting the First Taiwan Strait Crisis.
1967 – Dagen H in Sweden: Traffic changes from driving on the left to driving on the right overnight.
1971 – Qatar becomes an independent state.
1976 – Viking program: The American Viking 2 spacecraft lands at Utopia Planitia on Mars.
1978 – During the Rhodesian Bush War a group of ZIPRA guerrillas shot down civilian Vickers Viscount aircraft (Air Rhodesia Flight 825) with a Soviet-made SAM Strela-2; of 56 passengers and crew 38 people died in crash, 10 were massacred by the guerrillas at the site.
1981 – The Convention on the Elimination of All Forms of Discrimination Against Women, an international bill of rights for women, is instituted by the United Nations.
1987 – In a coup d'état in Burundi, President Jean-Baptiste Bagaza is deposed by Major Pierre Buyoya.
1989 – Varig Flight 254 crashes in the Amazon rainforest near São José do Xingu in Brazil, killing 12.
1997 – Vietnam Airlines Flight 815 (Tupolev Tu-134) crashes on approach into Phnom Penh airport, killing 64.
2001 – In Belfast, Protestant loyalists begin a picket of Holy Cross, a Catholic primary school for girls.
2004 – Beslan school  siege results in over 330 fatalities, including 186 children.
2010 – After taking off from Dubai International Airport, UPS Airlines Flight 6 develops an in-flight fire in the cargo hold and crashes near Nad Al Sheba, killing both crew members on board.
2016 – The U.S. and China, together responsible for 40% of the world's carbon emissions, both formally ratify the Paris global climate agreement.
2017 – North Korea conducts its sixth and most powerful nuclear test.

Births

Pre-1600
1034 – Emperor Go-Sanjō of Japan (d. 1073)
1568 – Adriano Banchieri, Italian organist and composer (d. 1634)

1601–1900
1675 – Paul Dudley, American lawyer and jurist (d. 1751)
1693 – Charles Radclyffe, English captain and politician (d. 1746)
1695 – Pietro Antonio Locatelli, Italian violin player and composer (d. 1764)
1704 – Joseph de Jussieu, French explorer, geographer, and mathematician, (d. 1779)  
1710 – Abraham Trembley, Swiss biologist and zoologist (d. 1784)
1724 – Guy Carleton, 1st Baron Dorchester, Irish-English general and politician, 21st Governor General of Canada (d. 1808)
1781 – Eugène de Beauharnais, French general and politician (d. 1824)
1803 – Prudence Crandall, American educator (d. 1890)
1810 – Paul Kane, Irish-Canadian painter (d. 1871)
1811 – John Humphrey Noyes, American activist, founded the Oneida Community (d. 1886)
1814 – James Joseph Sylvester, English mathematician and academic (d. 1897)
1820 – George Hearst, American businessman and politician  (d. 1891)
1840 – Jacob Christian Fabricius, Danish composer (d. 1919)
1841 – Tom Emmett, English cricketer (d. 1904)
1849 – Sarah Orne Jewett, American novelist, short story writer and poet (d. 1909)
1851 – Olga Constantinovna of Russia, Queen consort of the Hellenes (d. 1926)
1854 – Charles Tatham, American fencer (d. 1939)
1856 – Louis Sullivan, American architect and educator, designed the Carson, Pirie, Scott and Company Building (d. 1924)
1869 – Fritz Pregl, Slovenian chemist and physician, Nobel Prize laureate (d. 1930)
1875 – Ferdinand Porsche, Austrian-German engineer and businessman, founded Porsche (d. 1951)
1878 – Dorothea Douglass Lambert Chambers, English tennis player (d. 1960)
1882 – Johnny Douglas, English cricketer and boxer (d. 1930)
1887 – Frank Christian, American trumpet player (d. 1973)
1897 – Sally Benson, American author and screenwriter (d. 1972)
1899 – Frank Macfarlane Burnet, Australian virologist and academic, Nobel Prize laureate (d. 1985)
1900 – Percy Chapman, English cricketer (d. 1961)
  1900   – Urho Kekkonen, Finnish journalist, lawyer, and politician, 8th President of Finland (d. 1986)

1901–present
1901 – Eduard van Beinum, Dutch violinist, pianist, and conductor (d. 1959)
1905 – Carl David Anderson, American physicist and academic, Nobel Prize laureate (d. 1991)
  1905   – John Mills, New Zealand cricketer (d. 1972)
1907 – Loren Eiseley, American anthropologist, philosopher, and author (d. 1977)
1908 – Lev Pontryagin, Russian mathematician and academic (d. 1988)
1910 – Kitty Carlisle, American actress, singer, socialite, and game show panelist (d. 2007)
  1910   – Franz Jáchym, Austrian Roman Catholic archbishop (d.1984)
  1910   – Maurice Papon, French civil servant (d. 2007)
1911 – Bernard Mammes, American cyclist and sergeant (d. 2000)
1913 – Alan Ladd, American actor and producer (d. 1964)
1914 – Dixy Lee Ray, American biologist and politician, 17th Governor of Washington (d. 1994)
1915 – Knut Nystedt, Norwegian organist and composer (d. 2014)
  1915   – Memphis Slim, American singer-songwriter and pianist (d. 1988)
1916 – Eddie Stanky, American baseball player, coach, and manager (d. 1999)
1918 – Helen Wagner, American actress (d. 2010)
1919 – Phil Stern, American soldier and photographer (d. 2014)
1920 – Tereska Torrès, French soldier and author (d. 2012)
1921 – John Aston Sr., English footballer (d. 2003)
  1921   – Thurston Dart, English pianist, conductor, and musicologist (d. 1971)
  1921   – Marguerite Higgins, American journalist and author (d. 1966)
1923 – Glen Bell, American businessman, founded Taco Bell (d. 2010)
  1923   – Alice Gibson, Belizean chief librarian and educator (d. 2021)
  1923   – Fred Hawkins, American golfer (d. 2014)
  1923   – Mort Walker, American cartoonist (d. 2018)
1924 – Mary Grace Canfield, American actress (d. 2014)
1925 – Anne Jackson, American actress (d. 2016)
  1925   – Bengt Lindström, Swedish painter and sculptor (d. 2008)
  1925   – Hank Thompson, American singer-songwriter and guitarist (d. 2007)
1926 – Alison Lurie, American author and academic (d. 2020)
  1926   – Irene Papas, Greek actress (d. 2022)
  1926   – Uttam Kumar, Indian Bengali actor, director, producer, singer, composer and playback singer (d. 1980) 
1928 – Gaston Thorn, Luxembourg lawyer and politician, 8th Prime Minister of Luxembourg (d. 2007)
1929 – Whitey Bulger, American organized crime boss (d. 2018)
  1929   – Carlo Clerici, Swiss cyclist (d. 2007)
  1929   – Steve Rickard, New Zealand-Australian wrestler, trainer, and promoter (d. 2015)
  1929   – Armand Vaillancourt, Canadian sculptor and painter
1930 – Cherry Wilder, New Zealand author and poet (d. 2002)
1931 – Dick Motta, American basketball player and coach
  1931   – Guy Spitaels, Belgian academic and politician, 7th Minister-President of Wallonia (d. 2012)
1932 – Eileen Brennan, American actress and singer (d. 2013)
1933 – Basil Butcher, Guyanese cricketer (d. 2019)
  1933   – Tompall Glaser, American singer-songwriter (d. 2013)
1934 – Freddie King, American singer-songwriter and guitarist (d. 1976)
1935 – Helmut Clasen, German-Canadian motorcycle racer
1936 – Zine El Abidine Ben Ali, Tunisian soldier and politician, 2nd President of Tunisia (d. 2019)
  1936   – Pilar Pallete, Peruvian-American actress 
1938 – Liliane Ackermann, French microbiologist, community leader, writer, and lecturer (d. 2007) 
  1938   – Sarah Bradford, English historian and author
  1938   – Caryl Churchill, English-Canadian playwright
  1938   – Richard MacCormac, English architect, founded MJP Architects (d. 2014)
  1938   – Ryōji Noyori, Japanese chemist and academic, Nobel Prize laureate
1940 – Frank Duffy, English architect
  1940   – Pauline Collins, English actress 
  1940   – Eduardo Galeano, Uruguayan journalist and author (d. 2015)
  1940   – Brian Lochore, New Zealand rugby player and coach (d. 2019)
1941 – Sergei Dovlatov, Russian-American journalist and author (d. 1990)
1942 – Al Jardine, American singer-songwriter and guitarist 
1943 – Valerie Perrine, American model and actress
1944 – Geoff Arnold, English cricketer and coach
  1944   – Ray Groom, Australian footballer, lawyer, and politician, 39th Premier of Tasmania
1945 – George Biondo, American bass player and songwriter 
  1945   – Peter Goddard, English physicist and mathematician
1947 – Kjell Magne Bondevik, Norwegian minister and politician, 26th Prime Minister of Norway
  1947   – Michael Connarty, Scottish educator and politician
  1947   – Mario Draghi, Italian banker and economist
  1947   – Gérard Houllier, French footballer and coach (d. 2020)
  1947   – Susan Milan, English flute player and composer
1948 – Don Brewer, American drummer and singer-songwriter
  1948   – Lyudmila Karachkina, Ukrainian astronomer
  1948   – Fotis Kouvelis, Greek lawyer and politician, Greek Minister of Justice
  1948   – Levy Mwanawasa, Zambian lawyer and politician, 3rd President of Zambia (d. 2008)
1949 – José Pékerman, Argentinian footballer, coach, and manager
  1949   – Patriarch Peter VII of Alexandria (d. 2004)
1950 – Doug Pinnick, American rock singer-songwriter and bass player
1951 – Denys Hobson, South African cricketer
1953 – Jean-Pierre Jeunet, French director, producer, and screenwriter
  1953   – George Peponis, Greek-Australian rugby league player and physician
1954 – Jaak Uudmäe, Estonian triple jumper and coach
1955 – Steve Jones, English singer-songwriter and guitarist
1956 – Jishu Dasgupta, Indian actor and director (d. 2012)
  1956   – Pat McGeown, Irish republican activist (d. 1996)
  1956   – Stephen Woolley, English director and producer
1957 – Garth Ancier, American businessman 
  1957   – Earl Cureton, American basketball player and coach
  1957   – Steve Schirripa, American actor and producer
  1957   – Sadhguru, Indian yogi, mystic
1960 – Nick Gibb, English accountant and politician
1961 – Andy Griffiths, Australian author 
1962 – David De Roure, English computer scientist and academic
1963 – Sam Adams, American politician, 51st Mayor of Portland
  1963   – Mubarak Ghanim, Emirati footballer
  1963   – Malcolm Gladwell, Canadian journalist, essayist, and critic
1964 – Adam Curry, American-Dutch businessman and television host, co-founded mevio
  1964   – Spike Feresten, American screenwriter and producer
  1964   – Junaid Jamshed, Pakistani singer-songwriter and guitarist (d. 2016)
1965 – Rachel Johnson, British journalist
  1965   – Vaden Todd Lewis, American singer-songwriter and guitarist
  1965   – Charlie Sheen, American actor and producer
1966 – Steven Johnson Leyba, American painter and author
  1966   – Vladimir Ryzhkov, Russian historian and politician
1967 – Chris Gatling, American basketball player
  1967   – Luis Gonzalez, Cuban-American baseball player
1968 – Grace Poe, Filipino educator and politician
1969 – Noah Baumbach, American actor, director, producer, and screenwriter
  1969   – John Fugelsang, American comedian, actor, and talk show host
  1969   – Robert Karlsson, Swedish golfer
  1969   – Marianna Komlos, Canadian bodybuilder, model, and wrestler (d. 2004)
  1969   – Matthew Offord, English journalist and politician
1970 – Jeremy Glick, American businessman (d. 2001)
  1970   – George Lynch, American basketball player and manager
  1970   – Gareth Southgate, English footballer and manager
1971 – Kiran Desai, Indian-American author
  1971   – Glen Housman, Australian swimmer
  1971   – Chabeli Iglesias, Portuguese-Spanish journalist
  1971   – Paolo Montero, Uruguayan footballer and manager
1972 – Christine Boudrias, Canadian speed skater
  1972   – Bob Evans, American wrestler and trainer
  1972   – Robbie O'Davis, Australian rugby league player
  1972   – Martin Straka, Czech ice hockey player
1973 – Damon Stoudamire, American basketball player and coach
1974 – Clare Kramer, American actress, producer, and screenwriter
  1974   – Rahul Sanghvi, Indian cricketer
1975 – Daniel Chan, Hong Kong singer-songwriter and actor
  1975   – Cristobal Huet, French ice hockey player
  1975   – Redfoo, American singer-songwriter, producer, and dancer 
1976 – Valery V. Afanasyev, Russian ice hockey player and coach
  1976   – Jevon Kearse, American football player
  1976   – Raheem Morris, American football player and coach 
1977 – Rui Marques, Angolan footballer
  1977   – Olof Mellberg, Swedish footballer
  1977   – Nate Robertson, American baseball player
1978 – Terje Bakken, Norwegian singer-songwriter (d. 2004)
  1978   – John Curtis, English footballer
  1978   – Michal Rozsíval, Czech ice hockey player
  1978   – Nick Wechsler, American actor
1979 – Júlio César, Brazilian footballer
  1979   – Tomo Miličević, Bosnian-American guitarist 
1980 – B.G., American rapper and actor 
  1980   – Daniel Bilos, Argentinian footballer
  1980   – Cindy Burger, Dutch footballer
  1980   – Jason McCaslin, Canadian singer-songwriter, bass player, and producer 
  1981   – Fearne Cotton, English television and radio presenter
1982 – Sarah Burke, Canadian skier (d. 2012)
  1982   – Andrew McMahon, American singer-songwriter, pianist, and producer 
  1982   – Kaori Natori, Japanese singer 
  1982   – Tiago Rannow, Brazilian footballer
1983 – Augusto Farfus, Brazilian race car driver
  1983   – Nicky Hunt, English footballer
  1983   – Marcus McCauley, American football player
  1983   – Valdas Vasylius, Lithuanian basketball player
1984 – Garrett Hedlund, American actor
  1984   – T. J. Perkins, Filipino-American wrestler
1985 – Scott Carson, English footballer
  1985   – Kelvin Wilson, English footballer
1986 – Shaun White, American snowboarder, skateboarder, and guitarist
  1986   – OMI, Jamaican singer 
1987 – Allie, Canadian wrestler
  1987   – Modibo Maïga, Malian footballer
  1987   – Dawid Malan, English cricketer
  1987   – James Neal, Canadian ice hockey player
1988 – Jérôme Boateng, Ghanaian-German footballer
  1988   – Hana Makhmalbaf, Iranian director and producer
1992 – August Alsina, American singer-songwriter
1993 – Lee So-jung, South Korean singer
1993 – Dominic Thiem, Austrian tennis player
1994 – Francis Molo, New Zealand rugby league player
  1994   – Glen Rea, English-Irish footballer 
1995 – Niklas Süle, German footballer
1996 – Joy, South Korean idol and actress
  1996   – Adama Barro, Burkinabé footballer
  1996   – Abrahm DeVine, American swimmer
  1996   – Veronika Domjan, Slovenian athlete
  1996   – William Eskelinen, Swedish footballer
  1996   – Dwayne Green, Dutch footballer
  1996   – D. J. Hogg, American basketball player
  1996   – Nanda Kyaw, Burmese footballer
  1996   – Florian Maitre, French cyclist
  1996   – Callum Moore, Australian footballer
  1996   – Neilson Powless, American cyclist
  1996   – Osgar O'Hoisin, Irish tennis player
  1996   – Zhang Tingting, Chinese handball player
  1996   – Brad Walsh, Australian footballer
  1996   – Yoane Wissa, French footballer
1997 – Andrew Austin, Irish cricketer
  1997   – Sulayman Bojang, Norwegian footballer
  1997   – Reniece Boyce, West Indian cricketer
  1997   – Carter Kieboom, American baseball player
  1997   – Petar Krstić, Macedonian footballer
  1997   – Devin Singletary, American football player
  1997   – Bernard Tekpetey, Ghanaian footballer
  1997   – Christopher Udeh, Nigerian footballer
2000 – Brandon Williams, English footballer
2010 – Tanitoluwa Adewumi, Nigerian-American chess player

Deaths

Pre-1600
 264 – Sun Xiu, Chinese emperor (b. 235)
 618 – Xue Ju, emperor of Qin
 863 – Umar al-Aqta, Arab emir
 931 – Uda, emperor of Japan (b. 867)
1120 – Gerard Thom (The Blessed Gerard), founder of the Knights Hospitaller (b. c. 1040)
1189 – Jacob of Orléans, French Jewish scholar
1301 – Alberto I della Scala, Lord of Verona
1313 – Anna of Bohemia (b. 1290)
1354 – Joanikije II, Serbian patriarch and saint
1400 – John Holland, 1st Duke of Exeter (b. c. 1352)
1402 – Gian Galeazzo Visconti, Italian son of Galeazzo II Visconti (b. 1351)
1420 – Robert Stewart, Duke of Albany (b. 1340)
1467 – Eleanor of Portugal, Holy Roman Empress (b. 1434)
1592 – Robert Greene, English author and playwright (b. 1558)

1601–1900
1609 – Jean Richardot, Belgian diplomat (b. 1540)
1634 – Edward Coke, English lawyer, judge, and politician, Lord Chief Justice of England and Wales (b. 1552)
1653 – Claudius Salmasius, French scholar and author (b. 1588)
1658 – Oliver Cromwell, English general and politician (b. 1599)
1720 – Henri de Massue, Earl of Galway, French general and diplomat (b. 1648)
1729 – Jean Hardouin, French historian and scholar (b. 1646)
1766 – Archibald Bower, Scottish historian and author (b. 1686)
1808 – John Montgomery, American merchant and politician (b. 1722)
1857 – John McLoughlin, Canadian-American businessman (b. 1784)
1866 – Konstantin Flavitsky, Russian painter (b. 1830)
1877 – Adolphe Thiers, French historian and politician, 2nd President of France (b. 1797)
1883 – Ivan Turgenev, Russian author and playwright (b. 1818)
1886 – William W. Snow, American lawyer and politician (b. 1812)
1893 – James Harrison, Scottish-Australian engineer, journalist, and politician (b. 1816)

1901–present
1901 – Evelyn Abbott, English classical scholar (b. 1843)
1906 – Mihály Kolossa, Hungarian author and poet (b. 1846)
1914 – Albéric Magnard, French composer and educator (b. 1865)
1929 – John Bigham, 1st Viscount Mersey, English jurist and politician (b. 1840) 
1936 – Nikita Balieff, Armenian-Russian puppeteer and director (b. 1876)
1942 – Will James, Canadian-American author and illustrator (b. 1892)
  1942   – Séraphine Louis, French painter (b. 1864)
1944 – John Lumsden, Irish physician, founded the St. John Ambulance Brigade of Ireland (b. 1869)
1948 – Edvard Beneš, Czech academic and politician, 2nd President of Czechoslovakia (b. 1884)
1954 – Marika Kotopouli, Greek actress (b. 1887)
1961 – Robert E. Gross, American businessman (b. 1897)
1962 – E. E. Cummings, American poet and playwright (b. 1894)
1963 – Louis MacNeice, Irish poet and playwright (b. 1907)
1967 – Francis Ouimet, American golfer and banker (b. 1893)
1969 – John Lester, American cricketer and soccer player (b. 1871)
1970 – Vasil Gendov, Bulgarian actor, director, and screenwriter (b. 1891)
  1970   – Vince Lombardi, American football player and coach (b. 1913)
  1970   – Alan Wilson, American singer-songwriter and guitarist (b. 1943)
1974 – Harry Partch, American composer and theorist (b. 1901)
1977 – Gianni Vella, Maltese artist (b. 1885)
1980 – Barbara O'Neil, American actress (b. 1910)
  1980   – Duncan Renaldo, Romanian-American actor, producer, and screenwriter (b. 1904)
1981 – Alec Waugh, English soldier and author (b. 1898)
1985 – Johnny Marks, American songwriter (b. 1909)
1987 – Morton Feldman, American composer and educator (b. 1926)
1988 – Ferit Melen, Turkish civil servant and politician, 14th Prime Minister of Turkey (b. 1906)
1989 – Gaetano Scirea, Italian footballer (b. 1953)
1991 – Frank Capra, Italian-American director, producer, and screenwriter (b. 1897)
1993 – David Brown, English businessman (b. 1904)
1994 – James Thomas Aubrey, Jr., American screenwriter and producer (b. 1918)
  1994   – Billy Wright, English footballer and manager (b. 1924)
1995 – Mary Adshead, English painter (b. 1904)
1996 – Emily Kame Kngwarreye, Australian painter (b. 1910)
1999 – Emma Bailey, American auctioneer and author (b. 1910)
2000 – Edward Anhalt, American actor, producer, and screenwriter (b. 1914)
2001 – Pauline Kael, American film critic and author (b. 1919)
2002 – Kenneth Hare, Canadian climatologist and academic (b. 1919)
  2002   – W. Clement Stone, American businessman, philanthropist, and author (b. 1902)
2003 – Alan Dugan, American soldier and poet (b. 1923)
2003 – Rudolf Leiding, German businessman (b. 1914)
2005 – R. S. R. Fitter, English biologist and author (b. 1913)
  2005   – William Rehnquist, American lawyer and jurist, 16th Chief Justice of the United States (b. 1924)
2007 – Carter Albrecht, American keyboard player and guitarist (b. 1973)
  2007   – Syd Jackson, New Zealand trade union leader and activist (b. 1939)
  2007   – Jane Tomlinson, English runner (b. 1964)
  2007   – Steve Fossett, American aviator (b. 1944)
2008 – Donald Blakeslee, American colonel and pilot (b. 1917)
2010 – Noah Howard, American saxophonist (b. 1943)
  2010   – Robert Schimmel, American comedian, actor, and screenwriter (b. 1950)
2012 – Griselda Blanco, Colombian drug lord (b. 1943)
  2012   – Harold Dunaway, American race car driver and pilot (b. 1933)
  2012   – Michael Clarke Duncan, American actor (b. 1957)
  2012   – Siegfried Jamrowski, Russian-German soldier and pilot (b. 1917)
  2012   – Sun Myung Moon, Korean religious leader and businessman, founded the Unification Church (b. 1920)
  2012   – Charlie Rose, American lawyer and politician (b. 1939)
2013 – Ralph M. Holman, American lawyer and judge (b. 1914)
  2013   – Pedro Ferriz Santacruz, Mexican-American journalist (b. 1921) 
  2013   – José Ramón Larraz, Spanish director and screenwriter (b. 1929)
  2013   – Janet Lembke, American author and scholar (b. 1933)
  2013   – Don Meineke, American basketball player (b. 1930)
  2013   – Lewis Morley, Hong Kong-Australian photographer (b. 1925)
2014 – Aarno Raninen, Finnish singer-songwriter and pianist (b. 1944)
  2014   – A. P. Venkateswaran, Indian soldier and politician, 14th Foreign Secretary of India (b. 1930)
2015 – Adrian Cadbury, English rower and businessman (b. 1929)
  2015   – Judy Carne, English actress and comedian (b. 1939)
  2015   – Carter Lay, American businessman and philanthropist (b. 1971)
  2015   – Zhang Zhen, Chinese general and politician (b. 1914)
  2015   – Chandra Bahadur Dangi, world record holder for shortest man (b. 1939) 
2017 – Walter Becker, American musician, songwriter, and record producer  (b. 1950)
  2017   – John Ashbery, American poet (b. 1927)

Holidays and observances
Christian feast day:
Mansuetus of Toul
Marinus
Pope Gregory I
Remaclus
Prudence Crandall (Episcopal Church (USA))
September 3 (Eastern Orthodox liturgics)
China's victory over Japan commemoration related observances:
Armed Forces Day (Republic of China)
V-J Day (People's Republic of China)
Feast of San Marino and the Republic, celebrates the foundation of the Republic of San Marino in 301.
Flag Day (Australia)
Independence Day, celebrates the second independence of Qatar from the United Kingdom in 1971.
Levy Mwanawasa Day (Zambia)
Memorial Day (Tunisia)
Merchant Navy Remembrance Day (Canada)
Merchant Navy Day (United Kingdom)
National Welsh Rarebit Day (United States)
Tokehega Day (Tokelau, New Zealand)

References

External links

 
 
 

Days of the year
September